Luxembourgish (also Luxemburgish, Luxembourgian, Letzebu(e)rgesch;) is a West Germanic language that is spoken mainly in Luxembourg. About 400,000 people speak Luxembourgish worldwide.

As a standard form of the Moselle Franconian language, Luxembourgish has similarities with other varieties of High German and the wider group of West Germanic languages. The status of Luxembourgish as an official language in Luxembourg and the existence there of a regulatory body have removed Luxembourgish, at least in part, from the domain of Standard German, its traditional . It is also related to the Transylvanian Saxon dialect spoken by the Transylvanian Saxons in Transylvania, contemporary central Romania.

History
Luxembourgish was considered a German dialect like many others until about World War II but then it underwent ausbau, creating its own standard form in vocabulary, grammar, and spelling and therefore is seen today as an independent language.

As Luxembourgish has a maximum of some 285,000 native speakers, resources in the language like books, newspapers, magazines, television, internet etc. are limited. Since most Luxembourgers also speak Standard German and French, there is strong competition with these languages, which both have large language resources. Because of this, the use of Luxembourgish remains limited.

Language family 

Luxembourgish belongs to the West Central German group of the High German languages and is the primary example of a Moselle Franconian language. Furthermore, it is closely related to Transylvanian Saxon which has been spoken since the High Middle Ages by the Transylvanian Saxons in Transylvania, present-day central Romania.

Speech

Luxembourgish is considered the national language of Luxembourg and also one of the three administrative languages, alongside German and French.

In Luxembourg, 77% of citizens can speak Luxembourgish. Luxembourgish is also spoken in the Arelerland region of Belgium (part of the Province of Luxembourg) and in small parts of Lorraine in France.

In the German Eifel and Hunsrück regions, similar local Moselle Franconian dialects of German are spoken. The language is also spoken by a few descendants of Luxembourg immigrants in the United States and Canada.

Other Moselle Franconian dialects are spoken by ethnic Germans long settled in Transylvania, Romania (Siebenbürgen).

Moselle Franconian dialects outside the Luxembourg state border tend to have far fewer French loanwords, and these mostly remain from the French Revolution.

The political party that places the greatest importance on promoting, using and preserving Luxembourgish is the Alternative Democratic Reform Party (ADR) and its electoral success in the 1999 election pushed the CSV-DP government to make knowledge of it a criterion for naturalisation. It is currently also the only political party in Luxembourg that wishes to implement written laws also in Luxembourgish and that wants Luxembourgish to be an officially recognized language of the European Union. In this context, in 2005, politician Jean Asselborn of LSAP rejected a demand made by ADR to make Luxembourgish an official language of the European Union citing financial reasons and the suffiency of official German and French.

Varieties
There are several distinct dialect forms of Luxembourgish including Areler (from Arlon), Eechternoacher (Echternach), Kliärrwer (Clervaux), Miseler (Moselle), Stater (Luxembourg), Veiner (Vianden), Minetter (Southern Luxembourg) and Weelzer (Wiltz). Further small vocabulary differences may be seen even between small villages.

Increasing mobility of the population and the dissemination of the language through mass media such as radio and television are leading to a gradual standardisation towards a "Standard Luxembourgish" through the process of koineization.

Surrounding languages
There is no distinct geographic boundary between the use of Luxembourgish and the use of other closely related High German dialects (for example, Lorraine Franconian); it instead forms a dialect continuum of gradual change.

Spoken Luxembourgish is relatively hard to understand for speakers of German who are generally not familiar with Moselle Franconian dialects (or at least other West Central German dialects). They can usually read the language to some degree. For those Germans familiar with Moselle Franconian dialects, it is relatively easy to understand and speak Luxembourgish as far as the everyday vocabulary is concerned. The large number of French loanwords in Luxembourgish may hamper communication about certain topics, or with certain speakers (who use many French loanwords).

Writing

Standardisation
A number of proposals for standardising the orthography of Luxembourgish can be documented, going back to the middle of the 19th century. There was no officially recognised system until the adoption of the "OLO" on 5 June 1946. This orthography provided a system for speakers of all varieties of Luxembourgish to transcribe words the way they pronounced them, rather than imposing a single, standard spelling for the words of the language. Similarly, new principles were adopted for the spelling of French loanwords.
This proposed orthography, so different from existing "foreign" standards that people were already familiar with, did not enjoy widespread approval.

A more successful standard eventually emerged from the work of the committee of specialists charged with the task of creating the Luxemburger Wörterbuch, published in 5 volumes between 1950 and 1977. The orthographic conventions adopted in this decades-long project, set out in Bruch (1955), provided the basis of the standard orthography that became official on 10 October 1975. Modifications to this standard were proposed by the Permanent Council of the Luxembourguish language and adopted officially in the spelling reform of 30 July 1999. A detailed explanation of current practice for Luxembourgish can be found in Schanen & Lulling (2003).

Alphabet

In loanwords from French and Standard German, other diacritics are usually preserved:
 German: ,  (from German ), etc.

In German loanwords, the digraphs  and  indicate the diphthong , which does not appear in native words.

Orthography of vowels

{| class="wikitable"
|+ Monophthongs
! Spelling
! IPA
! Example
|-
| rowspan="2" style="vertical-align: middle;" | a
| 
| 
|-
| rowspan="2" style="vertical-align: middle;" | 
| 
|-
| aa
| 
|-
| ä
| rowspan="2" style="vertical-align: middle;" | 
| 
|-
| rowspan="2" style="vertical-align: middle;" | e
| 
|-
| rowspan="2" style="vertical-align: middle;" | 
| 
|-
| ë
| 
|-
| é
| 
| 
|-
| ee
| 
| 
|-
| rowspan="2" style="vertical-align: middle;" | i
| 
| 
|-
| rowspan="2" style="vertical-align: middle;" | 
| 
|-
| ii
| 
|-
| rowspan="2" style="vertical-align: middle;" | o
| 
| 
|-
| rowspan="2" | 
| 
|-
| oo
| 
|-
| rowspan="2" style="vertical-align: middle;" | u
| 
| 
|-
| rowspan="2" style="vertical-align: middle;" | 
| 
|-
| uu
| 
|}

{| class="wikitable"
|+ Diphthongs
! Spelling
! IPA
! Example
|-
| ai
| rowspan="2" style="vertical-align: middle;" | 
| 
|-
| ei
| 
|-
| äi
| 
| 
|-
| rowspan="2" style="vertical-align: middle;" | au
| 
| 
|-
| 
| 
|-
| éi
| 
| 
|-
| 
| rowspan="2" | 
| 
|-
| ier
| 
|-
| ou
| 
| 
|-
| ue
| rowspan="2" | 
| 
|-
| uer
| 
|}

{| class="wikitable"
|+ r-vocalization
! Spelling
! IPA
! Example
|-
| ar
| rowspan="2" | 
| 
|-
| aar
| 
|-
| är
| rowspan="2" | 
| 
|-
| äer
| 
|-
| er
| 
| 
|-
| ir
| rowspan="2" | 
| 
|-
| ier
| 
|-
| or
| rowspan="2" | 
| 
|-
| oer
| 
|-
| ur
| rowspan="2" | 
| 
|-
| uer
| 
|}

Eifeler Regel

Like many other varieties of Western High German, Luxembourgish has a rule of final n-deletion in certain contexts. For example:
  "when I go", but  "when we go"
  "thirty-five", but  "forty-five".

Phonology

Consonants

The consonant inventory of Luxembourgish is quite similar to that of Standard German.

  occurs only in loanwords from Standard German. Just as for many native speakers of Standard German, it tends to be simplified to  word-initially.
  is realised as  when it occurs after , e.g. zwee  ('two').
  appears only in a few words, such as spadséieren  ('to go for a walk').
  occurs only in loanwords from English.
  have two types of allophones: alveolo-palatal  and uvular . The latter occur before back vowels, and the former occur in all other positions.

Vowels

 The front rounded vowels  appear only in loanwords from French and Standard German. In loanwords from French, nasal  also occur. 
  has two allophones:
 Before velars: close-mid front unrounded , which, for some speakers, may be open-mid , especially before .
 All other positions: mid central vowel, more often slightly rounded  than unrounded .

  appears only in loanwords from Standard German.
 The first elements of  may be phonetically short  in fast speech or in unstressed syllables.
 The  and  contrasts arose from the former lexical tone contrast; the shorter  were used in words with Accent 1, and the lengthened  were used in words with Accent 2.

Grammar

Nominal syntax
Luxembourgish has three genders (masculine, feminine, and neuter), and three cases (nominative, accusative, and dative). These are marked morphologically on determiners and pronouns. As in German, there is no morphological gender distinction in the plural.

The forms of the articles and of some selected determiners are given below:

As seen above, Luxembourgish has plural forms of en ("a, an"), namely eng in the nominative/accusative and engen in the dative. They are not used as indefinite articles, which—as in German and English—do not exist in the plural, but they do occur in the compound pronouns wéi en ("what, which") and sou en ("such"). For example: wéi eng Saachen ("what things"); sou eng Saachen ("such things"). Moreover, they are used before numbers to express an estimation: eng 30.000 Spectateuren ("some 30,000 spectators").

Distinct nominative forms survive in a few nominal phrases such as der Däiwel ("the devil") and eiser Herrgott ("our Lord"). Rare examples of the genitive are also found: Enn des Mounts ("end of the month"), Ufanks der Woch ("at the beginning of the week"). The functions of the genitive are normally expressed using a combination of the dative and a possessive determiner: e.g. dem Mann säi Buch (lit. "to the man his book", i.e. "the man's book"). This is known as a periphrastic genitive, and is a phenomenon also commonly seen in dialectal and colloquial German, and in Dutch.

The forms of the personal pronouns are given in the following table (unstressed forms appear in parentheses):

The 2pl form is also used as a polite singular (like French vous, see T-V distinction); the forms are capitalised in writing:
Wéi hues du de Concert fonnt? ("How did you [informal sg.] like the concert?")
Wéi hutt dir de Concert fonnt? ("How did you [informal pl.] like the concert?")
Wéi hutt Dir de Concert fonnt?  ("How did you [formal sg. or pl.] like the concert?")

Like most varieties of colloquial German, but even more invariably, Luxembourgish uses definite articles with personal names. They are obligatory and not to be translated:
De Serge ass an der Kichen. ("Serge is in the kitchen.")

A feature Luxembourgish shares with only some western dialects of German is that women and girls are most often referred to with forms of the neuter pronoun hatt:
Dat ass d'Nathalie. Hatt ass midd, well et vill a sengem Gaart geschafft huet. ("That's Nathalie. She is tired because she has worked a lot in her garden.")

Adjectives
Luxembourgish morphology distinguishes two types of adjective: attributive and predicative. Predicative adjectives appear with verbs like sinn ("to be"), and receive no extra ending:
 De Mann ass grouss. (masculine, "The man is tall.")
 D'Fra ass grouss. (feminine, "The woman is tall.")
 D'Meedchen ass grouss. (neuter, "The girl is tall.")
 D'Kanner si grouss. (plural, "The children are tall.")

Attributive adjectives are placed before the noun they describe, and change their ending according to the grammatical gender, number, and case:
 de grousse Mann (masculine)
 déi grouss Fra (feminine)
 dat grousst Meedchen (neuter)
 déi grouss Kanner (plural)

Curiously, the definite article changes with the use of an attributive adjective: feminine d' goes to déi (or di), neuter d' goes to dat, and plural d' changes to déi.

The comparative in Luxembourgish is formed analytically, i.e. the adjective itself is not altered (compare the use of -er in German and English; tall → taller, klein → kleiner). Instead it is formed using the adverb méi: e.g. schéin → méi schéin
 Lëtzebuerg ass méi schéi wéi Esch. ("Luxembourg is prettier than Esch.")

The superlative involves a synthetic form consisting of the adjective and the suffix -st: e.g. schéin → schéinst  (compare German schönst, English prettiest). Attributive modification requires the emphatic definite article and the inflected superlative adjective:
 dee schéinste Mann ("the most handsome man")
 déi schéinst Fra ("the prettiest woman")

Predicative modification uses either the same adjectival structure or the adverbial structure am+ -sten: e.g. schéin → am schéinsten:
 Lëtzebuerg ass dee schéinsten / deen allerschéinsten / am schéinsten. ("Luxembourg is the most beautiful (of all).")

Some common adjectives have exceptional comparative and superlative forms:
 gutt, besser, am beschten ("good, better, best")
 vill, méi, am meeschten ("much, more, most")
 wéineg, manner, am mannsten ("few, fewer, fewest")

Several other adjectives also have comparative forms, not commonly used as normal comparatives, but in special senses:
 al ("old") → eeler Leit ("elderly people"), but: méi al Leit ("older people, people older than X")
 fréi ("early") → de fréiere President ("the former president"), but: e méi fréien Termin ("an earlier appointment")
 laang ("long") → viru längerer Zäit ("some time ago"), but: eng méi laang Zäit ("a longer period of time")

Word order
Luxembourgish exhibits "verb second" word order in clauses. More specifically, Luxembourgish is a V2-SOV language, like German and Dutch. In other words, we find the following finite clausal structures:
 the finite verb in second position in declarative clauses and wh-questions
Ech kafen en Hutt. Muer kafen ech en Hutt. (lit. "I buy a hat. Tomorrow buy I a hat.)
Wat kafen ech haut? (lit. "What buy I today?")
 the finite verb in first position in yes/no questions and finite imperatives
Bass de midd? ("Are you tired?")
Gëff mer deng Hand! ("Give me your hand!")
 the finite verb in final position in subordinate clauses
Du weess, datt ech midd sinn. (lit. "You know, that I tired am.")

Non-finite verbs (infinitives and participles) generally appear in final position:
 compound past tenses
Ech hunn en Hutt kaf. (lit. "I have a hat bought.")
 infinitival complements
Du solls net esou vill Kaffi drénken. (lit. "You should not so much coffee drink.")
 infinitival clauses (e.g., used as imperatives)
Nëmme Lëtzebuergesch schwätzen! (lit. "Only Luxembourgish speak!")

These rules interact so that in subordinate clauses, the finite verb and any non-finite verbs must all cluster at the end. Luxembourgish allows different word orders in these cases:
Hie freet, ob ech komme kann. (cf. German Er fragt, ob ich kommen kann.) (lit. "He asks if I come can.")
Hie freet, ob ech ka kommen. (cf. Dutch Hij vraagt of ik kan komen.) (lit. "He asks if I can come.")
This is also the case when two non-finite verb forms occur together:
Ech hunn net kënne kommen. (cf. Dutch Ik heb niet kunnen komen.) (lit, "I have not be-able to-come")
Ech hunn net komme kënnen. (cf. German Ich habe nicht kommen können.) (lit, "I have not to-come be-able")

Luxembourgish (like Dutch and German) allows prepositional phrases to appear after the verb cluster in subordinate clauses:
alles, wat Der ëmmer wollt wëssen iwwer Lëtzebuerg
(lit. "everything what you always wanted know about Luxembourg")

Vocabulary
Luxembourgish has borrowed many French words. For example, the word for a bus driver is Buschauffeur (as in Dutch and Swiss German), which would be Busfahrer in German and chauffeur de bus in French.

Some words are different from Standard German, but have equivalents in German dialects. An example is Gromperen (potatoes – German: Kartoffeln). Other words are exclusive to Luxembourgish.

Selected common phrases

Note: Words spoken in sound clip do not reflect all words on this list.

Neologisms
Neologisms in Luxembourgish include both entirely new words, and the attachment of new meanings to old words in everyday speech. The most recent neologisms come from the English language in the fields of telecommunications, computer science, and the Internet.

Recent neologisms in Luxembourgish include:
 direct loans from English: Browser, Spam, CD, Fitness, Come-back, Terminal, Hip, Cool, Tip-top
 also found in German: Sichmaschinn (search engine, German: Suchmaschine), schwaarzt Lach (black hole, German: Schwarzes Loch), Handy (mobile phone), Websäit (webpage, German: Webseite)
 native Luxembourgish
 déck as an emphatic like ganz and voll, e.g. Dëse Kuch ass déck gutt! ("This cake is really good!")
 recent expressions, used mainly by teenagers: oh mëllen! ("oh crazy"), en décke gelénkt ("you've been tricked") or cassé (French for "(you've been) owned")

Academic projects 
Between 2000 and 2002, Luxembourgish linguist Jérôme Lulling compiled a lexical database of 125,000-word forms as the basis for the first Luxembourgish spellchecker (Projet C.ORT.IN.A).

The LaF (Lëtzebuergesch als Friemsprooch – Luxembourgish as a Foreign Language) is a set of four language proficiency certifications for Luxembourgish and follows the ALTE framework of language examination standards. The tests are administered by the Institut National des Langues Luxembourg.

The "Centre for Luxembourg Studies" at the University of Sheffield was founded in 1995 on the initiative of Professor Gerald Newton. It is supported by the government of Luxembourg which funds an endowed chair in Luxembourg Studies at the university.
The first class of students to study the language outside of the country as undergraduate students began their studies at the 'Centre for Luxembourg Studies' at Sheffield in the academic year 2011–2012.

Endangered status claims 
UNESCO declared Luxembourgish to be an endangered language in 2019, adding it to its Atlas of the World's Languages in Danger.

Additionally, some local media have argued that the Luxembourgish language is at risk of disappearing, and that it should be considered an endangered language. Even though the government claims that more people than ever are able to speak Luxembourgish, these are absolute numbers and often include the many naturalized citizens who have passed the Sproochentest, a language test that certifies the knowledge of merely A.2. in speaking and B.1. in understanding.

Luxembourgish language expert and historian Alain Atten argues that not only the absolute number of Luxembourgish speakers should be considered when defining the status of a language, but also the proportion of speakers in a country. Noting that the proportion of native Luxembourgish speakers has decreased in recent decades, Atten believes that Luxembourgish will inevitably disappear, stating:

"It is simple math, if there are about 70% foreigners and about 30% Luxembourgers (which is the case in Luxembourg City), then it can impossibly be said that Luxembourgish is thriving. That would be very improbable."

Alain Atten also points out that the situation is even more dramatic, since the cited percentages take only the residents of Luxembourg into account, excluding the 200,000 cross-border-workers present in the country on a daily basis. This group plays a major role in the daily use of languages in Luxembourg, thus further lowering the percentage of Luxembourgish speakers present in the country.

The following numbers are based on statistics by STATEC (those since 2011) and show that the percentage of the population that is able to speak Luxembourgish has been constantly diminishing for years (Note that the 200,000 cross-border workers are not included in this statistic):

It has also been argued that two very similar languages, Alsatian and Lorraine Franconian, which were very broadly spoken by the local populations at the beginning of the 20th century in Alsace and in Lorraine respectively, have been nearly completely supplanted by French, and that a similar fate could also be possible for Luxembourgish. Another example of the replacement of Luxembourgish by French occurred in Arelerland (historically a part of Luxembourg, today in Belgium), where the vast majority of the local population spoke Luxembourgish as a native language well into the 20th century. Today, Luxembourgish is nearly extinct in this region, having been replaced by French.

According to some Luxembourgish news media and members of Actioun Lëtzebuergesch (an association for the preservation and promotion of the language), the biggest threat to the existence of Luxembourgish is indeed French, since French is the predominant language of most official documents and street signs in Luxembourg, thus considerably weakening the possibilitiy for Luxembourgish learners to practice the newly learned language. In most cases this passively forces expats to learn French instead of Luxembourgish.

In 2021 it was announced that public announcements in Luxembourgish (and in German as well) at Luxembourg Airport would cease; it would only be using French and English for future public announcements. This will cause Luxembourgish to go unused at Luxembourg Airport after many decades. Actioun Lëtzebuergesch declared itself to be hugely upset by this new governmental measure, citing that other airports in the world seem to have no problems making public announcements in multiple languages. According to a poll conducted by AL, 92.84% of the Luxembourgish population wished to have public announcements to be made in Luxembourgish at Luxembourg Airport.

Further fears of Luxembourgish's replacement by French were fueled in 2021 when ASTI (Association de Soutien aux Travailleurs Immigrés) wished to see Luxembourgish removed as the national language of Luxembourg (as written in the constitution), claiming that the national language of Luxembourg should by law be defined as the one that is most used in the local population, hinting that French would be the better choice.

According to ADR politician Fred Keup, Luxembourgish is already on its way to complete replacement by French.

See also

 Erna Hennicot-Schoepges
 Literature of Luxembourg
 Luxembourgish Swadesh List
 Multilingualism in Luxembourg

Notes and references

Notes

References

Bibliography

 Bruch, Robert. (1955) Précis de grammaire luxembourgeoise. Bulletin Linguistique et Ethnologique de l'Institut Grand-Ducal, Luxembourg, Linden. (2nd edition of 1968)
 
 Schanen, François and Lulling, Jérôme. (2003) Introduction à l'orthographe luxembourgeoise. (text available in French and Luxembourgish)

Further reading
In English
 NEWTON, Gerald (ed.), Luxembourg and Lëtzebuergesch: Language and Communication at the Crossroads of Europe, Oxford, 1996, 
 

In French
 BRAUN, Josy, et al. (en coll. avec Projet Moien), Grammaire de la langue luxembourgeoise. Luxembourg, Ministère de l'Éducation nationale et de la Formation professionnelle 2005. 
 SCHANEN, François, Parlons Luxembourgeois, Langue et culture linguistique d'un petit pays au coeur de l'Europe. Paris, L'Harmattan 2004, 
 SCHANEN, François / ZIMMER, Jacqui, 1,2,3 Lëtzebuergesch Grammaire. Band 1: Le groupe verbal. Band 2: Le groupe nominal. Band 3:L'orthographe. Esch-sur-Alzette, éditions Schortgen, 2005 et 2006
 SCHANEN, François / ZIMMER, Jacqui, Lëtzebuergesch Grammaire luxembourgeoise. En un volume. Esch-sur-Alzette, éditions Schortgen, 2012. 

In Luxembourgish
 SCHANEN, François, Lëtzebuergesch Sproocherubriken. Esch-sur-Alzette, éditions Schortgen, 2013.
 Meyer, Antoine, E' Schrek ob de' lezeburger Parnassus, Lezeburg (Luxembourg), Lamort, 1829

In German
 BRUCH, Robert, Grundlegung einer Geschichte des Luxemburgischen, Luxembourg, Publications scientifiques et littéraires du Ministère de l'Éducation nationale, 1953, vol. I; Das Luxemburgische im westfränkischen Kreis, Luxembourg, Publications scientifiques et littéraires du Ministère de l'Éducation nationale, 1954, vol. II
 MOULIN, Claudine and Nübling, Damaris (publisher): Perspektiven einer linguistischen Luxemburgistik. Studien zu Diachronie und Synchronie., Universitätsverlag Winter, Heidelberg, 2006. This book has been published with the support of the Fonds National de la Recherche
 
 BERG, Guy, Mir wëlle bleiwe wat mir sin: Soziolinguistische und sprachtypologische Betrachtungen zur luxemburgischen Mehrsprachigkeit., Tübingen, 1993 (Reihe Germanistische Linguistik 140). 
 (phrasebook) REMUS, Joscha, Lëtzebuergesch Wort für Wort. Kauderwelsch Band 104. Bielefeld, Reise Know-How Verlag 1997. 
 WELSCHBILLIG Myriam, SCHANEN François, Jérôme Lulling, Luxdico Deutsch: Luxemburgisch ↔ Deutsches Wörterbuch, Luxemburg (Éditions Schortgen) 2008, Luxdico Deutsch

External links

 Conseil Permanent de la Langue Luxembourgeoise

Spellcheckers and dictionaries
 Spellcheckers for Luxembourgish: Spellchecker.lu, Spellchecker.lu - Richteg Lëtzebuergesch schreiwen
 Luxdico online dictionary (24.000 words)
 Lëtzebuerger Online Dictionnaire (Luxembourgish Online Dictionary) with German, French and Portuguese translations created by the CPLL
 dico.lu – Dictionnaire Luxembourgeois//Français
 Luxembourgish Dictionary with pronunciation, translation to and from English, French, German, Portuguese, Spanish, Italian
 Luxogramm – Information system for the Luxembourgish grammar (University of Luxembourg, LU)

 
Germanic languages
Central German languages
German dialects
Languages of Belgium
Languages of France
Languages of Luxembourg
National symbols of Luxembourg
Verb-second languages
Walloon culture
Liège Province
Luxembourg (Belgium)
Arlon
St. Vith